Cyprinion acinaces acinaces is a subspecies of Cyprinion acinaces.

Footnotes 
 

acinaces acinaces